The 2018 Johan Cruyff Shield was the 23rd edition of the Johan Cruyff Shield, an annual Dutch football match played between the winners of the previous season's Eredivisie and KNVB Cup. The match was contested by PSV Eindhoven, champions of the 2017–18 Eredivisie, and Feyenoord, winners of the 2017–18 KNVB Cup. It was held at the Philips Stadion on 4 August 2018.

Match

See also
2017–18 Eredivisie 
2017–18 KNVB Cup

References

 

2018
2018–19 in Dutch football
PSV Eindhoven matches
Feyenoord matches
August 2018 sports events in the Netherlands
Johan Cruyff Shield 2018